Phospholipase A can refer to:

 Phospholipase A1
 Phospholipase A2
 Outer membrane phospholipase A1

An enzyme that displays both phospholipase A1 and phospholipase A2 activities is called a Phospholipase B  (see main article on phospholipases).